Darabi (also Romanized as Dārābī; also known as Bābā Jānī-ye Bālā and Dārāb Bābā Jānī) is a village in Ban Zardeh Rural District, in the Central District of Dalahu County, Kermanshah Province, Iran. At the 2006 census, its population was 83, in 17 families.

References 

Populated places in Dalahu County